Helga (derived from Old Norse heilagr - "holy", "blessed") is a female name, used mainly in Scandinavia, German-speaking countries and the Low Countries. (Hege, Helle, Helge, Helga, Helka or Oili). The name was in use in England before the Norman Conquest, but appears to have died out afterwards. It was re-introduced to English-speaking nations in the 20th century from Germany, the Netherlands, and the Nordic countries. Scandinavian male equivalent is Helge, or Helgi. Eastern Slavic names Olga (Ольга) and Oleg (Олег) are derived from it. 

Name days: Estonia - May 31, Hungary - October 3, Latvia - October 9, Sweden - November 21, Finland - May 31, Greece - 11 July

People
 Helga, also known as Saint Olga, (c. 890-969), Princess of Kiev

A
 Helga Adler (born 1943), East German historian and politician
 Helga de Alvear (born 1936), German art collector
 Helga Ancher (1883–1964), Danish painter
 Helga Anders (1948–1986), German-Austrian actress
 Helga Aradóttir (1538–1614), grand-daughter of executed Icelandic bishop Jón Arason 
 Helga Arendt (1964–2013), West German sprinter

B
 Helga Bachmann (1931–2011), Icelandic actress and director
 Helga Baum (born 1954), German mathematician
 Helga Bîrsan (born 1928), Romanian gymnast
 Helga Braathen (1953–1982), Norwegian artistic gymnast
 Helga de la Brache (1817–1885), Swedish con artist
 Helga Brofeldt (1881–1968), Swedish film actress

C
 Helga von Cramm (1840–1919), German–Swiss painter, illustrator, and graphic artist
 Helga Cranston (1921–2013), German film editor
 Helga Correia (born 1977), Portuguese politician

D
 Helga Dagsland (1910–2003), Norwegian nurse and organizational leader
 Helga Dancberga (1941–2019), Soviet then Latvian actress
 Helga Davis, New York-based multidisciplinary artist
 Helga Deen (1925–1943), Jewish victim of National Socialism
 Helga Dernesch (born 1939), Austrian soprano and mezzo soprano
 Helga Diederichsen (1930–2005), Mexican swimmer
 Helga Diercks-Norden (1924–2011), German journalist and feminist activist
 Helga Dietrich (1940–2018), German orchidologist and author
 Helga Dudzinski (1929–2022), German figure skater

E
 Helga Einsele (1910–2005), German criminologist, prison director, and high-profile prisons reformer
 Helga Eng (1875–1966), Norwegian psychologist and educationalist
 Helga Erhart, Austrian para-alpine skier
 Helga Estby (1860–1942), American suffragist

F
 Helga Fägerskiöld (1871–1958), Swedish baroness
 Helga Feddersen (1930–1990), German actress
 Helga Flatland (born 1984), Norwegian novelist and children's writer
 Helga Foght (1902–1974), Danish textile artist
 Helga Forner (1936–2004), professor of singing
 Helga Franck (1933–1963), German stage and film actress
 Helga Frier (1893-1972), Danish actress

G
 Helga Gitmark (1929–2008), Norwegian politician
 Helga Glöckner-Neubert (1938–2017), German writer
 Helga Gnauer (1929–1990), Austrian fencer
 Helga Goebbels (1932–1945), eldest daughter of Nazi propaganda minister Joseph Goebbels and Magda Goebbels
 Helga Goetze (1922–2008), German artist, writer, and free love activist
 Helga Gomes, biological oceanographer
 Helga Göring (1922–2010), German stage, television, and film actress
 Helga Grebing (1930–2017), German historian and university professor
 Helga Guitton, German radio announcer
 Helga Gunerius Eriksen (born 1950), Norwegian novelist and children's writer

H
 Helga Haase (1934–1989), Polish-born speed skater in East Germany
 Helga Hahnemann (1937–1991), East German multi-faceted stage performer and entertainer
 Helga Halldórsdóttir (born 1963), Icelandic hurdler
 Helga Haugen (born 1932), Norwegian politician
 Helga Haugland Byfuglien (born 1950), Norwegian bishop
 Helga Helgesen (1863–1936), Norwegian domestic science teacher and politician
 Helga Hellebrand-Wiedermann (1930–2013), Austrian sprint canoer
 Helga Henning (1937–2018), German sprinter
 Helga Henselder-Barzel (1940–1995), German political scientist
 Helga Hernes (born 1938), German-born Norwegian political scientist, diplomat, and politician
 Helga Hoffmann (born 1937), German track and field athlete
 Helga Hörz (born 1935), German Marxist philosopher and women's rights activist
 Helga Hošková-Weissová (born 1929), Czech artist and Holocaust survivor

I
 Helga Nadire İnan Ertürk (born 1984), Turkish-German footballer

J
 Helga Jensine Waabenø (1908–1994), Norwegian nurse and Lutheran missionary
 Helga Jónsdóttir (born 1957), professor in nursing

K
 Helga Karlsen (1882–1936), Norwegian politician
 Helga Klein (1931–2021), German athlete
 Helga Koch (born 1942), German fencer
 Helga Kohl (born 1943), Polish-born photographer based in Namibia
 Helga Königsdorf (1938–2014), German mathematician and author
 Helga Konrad (born 1948), Austrian politician
 Helga W. Kraft, German-American professor
 Helga Krapf (born 1988), Filipina actress
 Helga Krause (1935–1989), German film editor
 Helga Kreuter-Eggemann (1914–1970), German art historian
 Helga Kuhse, Australian philosopher
 Helga Kurm (1920–2011), Estonian pedagogical scientist

L
 Helga Labs (born 1940), East German politician 
 Helga Landauer (born 1969), Russian director, writer, and poet, based in New York City
 Helga Larsen (1884–1947), Danish trade unionist and pioneering politician
 Helga van Leur (born 1970), Dutch meteorologist
 Helga Lie (1930–2019), Norwegian politician
 Helga Lindner (born 1951), German swimmer
 Helga Liné (born 1932), Portuguese-Spanish film actress and circus acrobat
 Helga Livytska, Ukrainian humanitarian and public figure
 Helga Luber, former East German slalom canoeist
 Helga Lütten (born 1961), German former professional tennis player

M
 Helga Martin (1940–1999), German film actress
 Helga Matschkur (born 1943), German gymnast
 Helga Mees (1937–2014), German fencer
 Helga Moddansdóttir, Haakon Paulsson’s mistress
 Helga Molander (1896–1986), German actress
 Helga Moreira (born 1950), Portuguese poet
 Helga de la Motte-Haber (born 1938), German musicologist
 Helga Mucke-Wittbrodt (1910–1999), German physician
 Helga Mühlberg-Ulze, East German sprint canoeist

N
 Helga Neuner (born 1940), German actress
 Helga Newmark (1932–2012), first female Holocaust survivor ordained as a rabbi
 Helga Niemann (born 1956), German former swimmer
 Helga Niessen Masthoff (born 1941), retired West German tennis player
 Helga M. Novak (1935–2013), German-Icelandic writer
 Helga Nowitzki, German former international basketball player
 Helga Nowotny (born 1937), Austrian university professor emeritus

O-Ö
 Helga Offen (1951–2020), German volleyball player
 Helga Margrét Ögmundsdóttir (born 1948), Icelandic former professor
 Helga Margrét Þorsteinsdóttir (born 1991), Icelandic heptathlete

P
 Helga Pakasaar, Canada-based contemporary art curator and writer
 Helga Paris (born 1938), German photographer
 Helga Pedersen (1911–1980), Danish politician
 Helga Pedersen (born 1973), Norwegian politician
 Helga Pichler, Italian luger
 Helga Pilarczyk (1925–2011), German operatic soprano
 Helga Plumb (born 1939), Austrian-born Canadian architect
 Helga Pogatschar (born 1966), German composer

R
 Helga E. Rafelski (1949–2000), German particle physicist
 Helga Radtke (born 1962), German track and field athlete
 Helga Ramstad (1875–1956), Norwegian politician
 Helga Richter, retired German rower
 Helga Marie Ring Reusch (1865–1944), Norwegian painter
 Helga Ruebsamen (1934–2016), Dutch writer
 Helga Rullestad (born 1949), Norwegian politician
 Helga Rut Guðmundsdóttir (born 1970), Icelandic professor of music education

S
 Helga Salvesen (1963-2016), Norwegian physician and professor of medicine
 Helga Schauerte-Maubouet (born 1957), German-French organist, writer, and music editor
 Helga Schmid (born 1960), German diplomat
 Helga Schmidt-Neuber (1937-2018), German swimmer
 Helga Schneider (born 1937), Italian writer of German origin
 Helga Schubert (born 1940), German psychologist and author
 Helga Schultze (1940-2015), German female tennis player
 Helga Seibert (1939-1999), judge at Bundesverfassungsgericht
 Helga Seidler (born 1949), German former athlete and Olympic medalist
 Helga Sigurðardóttir (born 1969), Icelandic swimmer
 Helga María Sista (born 1947), Argentine alpine skier
 Helga Slessarev, scholar of German literature
 Helga Stene (1904-1983), Norwegian educator, feminist, and resistance member
 Helga Stentzel, Russian-born visual artist
 Helga Stephenson, Canadian media executive
 Helga Steudel (born 1939), German former motorcyclist and car racer
 Helga Stevens, Belgian politician
 Helga Stroh (born 1938), German fencer

T
 Helga Tawil-Souri (born 1969), Palestinian-American media scholar and documentary filmmaker
 Helga Testorf, subject of Andrew Wyeth's famous paintings
 Helga Thaler Ausserhofer (born 1952), Italian politician
 Helga Thomas (1891–1988), Swedish film actress
 Helle Thorning-Schmidt (born 1966), 41st Prime Minister of Denmark
 Helga Timm (1924-2014), German politician
 Helga Trüpel (born 1958), German politician (Bündnis 90/Die Grünen)

V
 Helga Vala Helgadóttir (born 1972), Icelandic politician
 Helga Vieira (born 1980), Portuguese female tennis player
 Helga Vlahović (1945–2012), Croatian journalist, producer, and television personality

W
 Helga Wagner (born 1956), German former swimmer
 Helga Wanglie (1903-1991), elderly woman in a persistent vegetative state
 Helga Weisz (born 1961), Austrian industrial ecologist, climate scientist, and professor of industrial ecology and climate change

Z
 Helga Zepp-LaRouche (born 1948), German journalist and politician
 Helga Zimmermann (born 1942), German former swimmer
 Helga Josephine Zinnbauer (1909-1980), Australian community worker and librarian
 Helga Zoega (born 1976), Icelandic professor of public health
 Helga Zöllner (1941-1983), Hungarian figure skater

Fictional characters
 Helga, wife of Hagar in the comic strip Hägar the Horrible
 Helga, a Dutch enemy character in the fighting game Human Killing Machine
 Helga the Fair, a character in Gunnlaugs saga ormstungu
 Helga, a character in the game Suikoden IV
 Helga Geerhart, a character in the BBC sitcom 'Allo 'Allo!
 Helga Hufflepuff, founder of Hogwarts' Hufflepuff house in the Harry Potter books
 Helga Jace, a character in DC Comics
 Helga Pataki, a character in the Nickelodeon animated series Hey Arnold!
 Helga Phugly, a character in The Oblongs
 Helga Sinclair, a character in Atlantis: The Lost Empire
 Helga Von Guggen, an antagonist in Totally Spies
 Helga Gallimard, wife of Rene Gallimard in the play M Butterfly
 Helga, wife of Floki, character in the historical series Vikings
 Helga Rasmussen, a founder of the Black Armory in the video game Destiny 2
 Helga von Bubble, a character in the Toy Story Toons short, Partysaurus Rex

Other 
 Helga, one of the two phantom torsos carried by the Artemis 1 mission

External links
 Popularity of the name in the United States

Scandinavian feminine given names
German feminine given names
Dutch feminine given names
Hungarian feminine given names
Norwegian feminine given names
Swedish feminine given names
Danish feminine given names
Finnish feminine given names
Icelandic feminine given names
Swiss feminine given names